FCAK-Liberia is a football (soccer) club from Liberia.  FCAK-Liberia was founded in 2008 after they participated in 2007 season as Mark Professionals.  There also is a FCAK-South Africa who plays in the second division of the league.  This team is privately owned by a South African Businessman.

Achievements 
Liberian Premier League: 0
Liberian Cup: 0
Liberian Super Cup: 0

Current squad

Football clubs in Liberia
Association football clubs established in 2008
2008 establishments in Liberia